Kim Deok-Il (born 11 July 1990) is a South Korean footballer who plays as a forward.

External links 

1990 births
Living people
Association football forwards
South Korean footballers
Seongnam FC players
K League 1 players
Sungkyunkwan University alumni